The following is a chronological list of the original studio recordings made by the Canadian pianist Glenn Gould in the years 1956–1982.

See also 
 Glenn Gould's recordings with orchestra

References
 
 

Gould, Glenn
Gould, Glenn
Discography